Cuisinier may refer to:

Books
Le Cusinier, Pierre de Lune (1656)
Le Cuisinier Royal François Massialot 
Le Cuisinier Impérial (1806)
Le cuisinier françois (1651)

Other
The cuisinier, a title for a cook under brigade de cuisine